Bandaranaike or Bandaranayake is a Sinhalese surname.

Notable people
 Anura Bandaranaike (1949–2008), Sri Lankan politician
 Chandrika Bandaranaike Kumaratunga (born 1945), Sri Lankan politician
 Charles Edward Bandaranaike Corea (died 1872), Ceylonese lawyer
 Dharmasiri Bandaranayake (born 1949), Sri Lankan film director and playwright
 Felix Dias Bandaranaike (1930–1985), Ceylonese politician
 Felix Reginald Dias Bandaranaike I (1861–1947), Ceylonese lawyer and judge
 Felix Reginald Dias Bandaranaike II (1891–1951), Ceylonese lawyer and judge
 Harry Dias Bandaranaike (1822–1901), Ceylonese lawyer and judge
 Indika Bandaranayake (born 1972), Sri Lankan politician
 J. C. Dias Bandaranaike, Ceylonese politician
 Kalpa Bandaranayake (born 1996), Sri Lankan cricketer
 Nalin Bandaranayake, Sri Lankan cricketer
 Pandu Bandaranaike (born 1962), Sri Lankan politician
 S. D. Bandaranayake (1917–2014), Ceylonese politician
 S. W. R. D. Bandaranaike (1899–1959), Ceylonese politician
 Shirani Bandaranayake (born 1958), Sri Lankan academic and judge
 Sirimavo Bandaranaike (1916–2000), Sri Lankan politician
 Solomon Dias Bandaranaike (1862–1946), Ceylonese headmen
 Sunethra Bandaranaike, Sri Lankan philanthropist and socialite

See also
 Bandaranaike family, a Sri Lankan family that is prominent in politics
 Bandaranaike International Airport
 Bandaranayake College
 
 

Sinhalese surnames